West Whiteland Inn is a historic inn and tavern located in West Whiteland Township, Chester County, Pennsylvania. It was built in two sections.  The older section dates to the 18th century and is a two-story, three-bay, single-pile stone structure.  About 1825, it was enlarged with the addition of a -story, double-pile Georgian-style stone addition.  Also on the property is a contributing former stone stable.

It was listed on the National Register of Historic Places in 1984.

References

Hotel buildings on the National Register of Historic Places in Pennsylvania
Georgian architecture in Pennsylvania
Hotel buildings completed in 1825
Buildings and structures in Chester County, Pennsylvania
National Register of Historic Places in Chester County, Pennsylvania